Cornet is an unincorporated community in Island County, in the U.S. state of Washington.

History
A post office called Cornet was established in 1910, and remained in operation until 1917. The community takes its name from nearby Cornet Bay.

References

Unincorporated communities in Island County, Washington
Unincorporated communities in Washington (state)